Potok may refer to:

Places

Bulgaria
Potok, Bulgaria, a village in Gabrovo Province

Croatia
Potok, Sisak-Moslavina County, a village

Poland
Potok, Gmina Sobienie-Jeziory in Masovian Voivodeship (east-central Poland), a settlement
Potok, Kutno County in Łódź Voivodeship (central), a village
Potok, Kuyavian-Pomeranian Voivodeship (north-central), a village
Potok, Lublin Voivodeship (east), a village
Potok, Lubusz Voivodeship (west), a village
Potok, Opatów County in Świętokrzyskie Voivodeship (south-central), a village
Potok, Podkarpackie Voivodeship (south-eastern), a village
Potok, Pomeranian Voivodeship (north), a settlement
Potok, Sieradz County in Łódź Voivodeship (central), a village
Potok, Subcarpathian Voivodeship (south-east)
Potok, Staszów County, Świętokrzyskie Voivodeship (south-central), a village

Romania
Potok, the Hungarian name for Potoc village, Sasca Montană Commune, Caraş-Severin County, Romania

Serbia
Potok (Prijepolje), a village

Slovakia
Potok, Rimavská Sobota District, a village
Potok, Ružomberok District, a village

Slovenia
Potok, Idrija, a village
Potok, Kamnik, a village
Potok, Kostel, a village
Potok, Nazarje, a village
Potok, Straža, a village
Potok, Trebnje, a village
Potok, Vodice, a former village
Potok, Železniki, a village
Potok Cave, an archaeological and paleontological site

Other uses
 Potok (company), a Russian investment and development company
 Anna Potok (1897–1987), Polish fashion designer and co-founder of Maximilian furriers, New York
 Chaim Potok (1929–2002), American rabbi and author

See also
 Bijeli Potok massacre, of Bosniaks by Serbs in 1992
 Koševski Potok, a river in Sarajevo, Bosnia and Herzegovina
 Potoc